Line 1 of the Saint Petersburg Metro, also known as Kirovsko-Vyborgskaya Line or Red Line, is the oldest rapid transit line in Saint Petersburg, Russia, opened in 1955, which connects Kirovsky and Vyborgsky districts of the city. The original stations are very beautiful and elaborately decorated, especially Avtovo and Narvskaya. The line connects four out of five Saint Petersburg's main railway stations. In 1995, a flooding occurred in a tunnel between Lesnaya and Ploschad Muzhestva stations and, for nine years, the line was separated into two independent segments (the gap was connected by a shuttle bus route). The line is also one of the two lines in the network to feature shallow stations, the other being the Nevsko-Vasileostrovskaya Line.

The line cuts Saint Petersburg centre on a northeast-southwest axis. In the south its alignment follows the shore of the Gulf of Finland. In the north it extends outside the city limits into the Leningrad oblast (it is the only line to stretch beyond the city boundary). The Kirovsko-Vyborgskaya Line is generally coloured red on Metro maps, and markup of this colour has been added to its stations for ease of passenger orientation; the new generation trains of  carriages since 2010s also have their outside colour matching the colour of the line.

Timeline

* Upon the 1977 extension, the temporary station Dachnoye (which had been the terminus since 1966) and its tracks were demolished.

Name changes

Transfers

The transfer on Tekhnologichesky Institut is a cross-platform one. Last transfer to the Frunzensko-Primorskaya Line has opened via Pushkinskaya in 2008.

Rolling stock
Two depots serve the line, Avtovo (№ 1) and Severnoe (№ 4), although when the lines separated in 1995 the Severnoe served the northern section whilst the Avtovo, along with other depots took over the southern section. As there was a large surplus in the north, conventional railway was used to transfer many of the trains to other depots. Upon the reunification of the two sections, the Severnoe depot's park was restored and the line became the first to start using eight-carriage trains, of which currently 34 and 20 trains are assigned respectively to the metro. Most of them are E, Em, Ema, and Emx trains built in the 1960s and 1970s.

Recent developments and future plans

Given the age of most of the stations on this line, constant renovations take place to restore them. The Vladimirskaya and Narvskaya stations closed for reconstruction from autumn 2006 until 2008. Debate continues over whether to open the controversial mosaic of Stalin (located on Narvskaya station behind the service room) to the public.  discussions have begun on extending the line southward.

Links
Saint Petersburg Metro official website

References

Saint Petersburg Metro lines
Railway lines opened in 1955
1955 establishments in Russia